Michael Dean Standly (born May 19, 1964) is an American professional golfer who has played on the PGA Tour and the Nationwide Tour.

Standly was born in Abilene, Texas. He attended the University of Houston and was a member of the golf team; he was an All-American in 1986, his senior year. He turned pro later that year.

Standly played the Ben Hogan Tour, now Nationwide Tour, in 1990. He earned his PGA Tour card for 1991 by finishing T-16 at qualifying school. He played on the PGA Tour from 1991 to 1999. From 2000 to 2008, he split his gradually decreasing playing time between the PGA Tour and Nationwide Tour.

Standly has 35 top-25 finishes in his PGA Tour career including 12 top-10 finishes. He is able to boast three top-5 finishes in one particular tournament: the Freeport-McMoRan Golf Classic. He had a T-2 there in 1992, a win in 1993, and a T-5 in 1995. Standly finished second at the 1997 Deposit Guaranty Golf Classic when Billy Ray Brown birdied the final hole to win by one stroke. His best finish in a major championship is T-16 at the 1993 U.S. Open.

Standly's best finish on the Nationwide Tour is T-3 at the 2003 Alberta Calgary Classic.

Standly lives in Houston, Texas.

Professional wins (1)

PGA Tour wins (1)

Results in major championships

Note: Standly never played in The Open Championship.

CUT = missed the half-way cut
"T" = tied

See also
1990 PGA Tour Qualifying School graduates
1991 PGA Tour Qualifying School graduates
1996 PGA Tour Qualifying School graduates

References

External links

American male golfers
Houston Cougars men's golfers
PGA Tour golfers
Golfers from Houston
Sportspeople from Abilene, Texas
1964 births
Living people